Oleacina is a genus of air-breathing land snails, terrestrial pulmonate gastropod mollusks in the family Oleacinidae.

Oleacina is the type genus of the family Oleacinidae.

Ecology 
Predators of Oleacina include larvae of the firefly bug Alecton discoidalis in Cuba.

References

Oleacinidae
Taxa named by Peter Friedrich Röding
Taxonomy articles created by Polbot